The Electoral district of Elsternwick was an electoral district of the Victorian Legislative Assembly situated in the Melbourne south-east suburb of Elsternwick, Victoria. It was created in 1945 and abolished in 1967.

Members for Elsternwick

Election results

See also
 Parliaments of the Australian states and territories
 List of members of the Victorian Legislative Assembly

Former electoral districts of Victoria (Australia)
1945 establishments in Australia
1967 disestablishments in Australia